Suq Al-Shuyukh Club, is an Iraqi football team based in Suq al-Shuyukh, Dhi Qar, that plays in Iraq Division One.

Managerial history

  Bassim Obaid
  Hassan Al-Araji 
  Moayad Tomeh
  Mohammed Kadhim

See also 
 2019–20 Iraq FA Cup
 2021–22 Iraq FA Cup

References

External links
 Suq Al-Shuyukh FC on Goalzz.com

2004 establishments in Iraq
Association football clubs established in 2004
Football clubs in Dhi Qar